Toronto has a large Italian Canadian community, with 30.3 per cent of the ethnic Italians in Canada living in the Greater Toronto Area (GTA) as of 2021. Toronto is home to the fourth largest population of people of Italian descent after São Paulo, Buenos Aires and New York City, respectively. As of the Canada 2021 Census, there were 468,970 Italian Canadians located in the Greater Toronto Area, with 444,755 located within the Toronto CMA.

Italian immigration to Toronto started as early as the mid 19th century. By 1860, over a dozen "Soldiers of fortune" and "men of letters" lived in Toronto. Italians arrived in Toronto in large numbers during the early 20th century, first settling in an area then known as The Ward, centred on University Avenue and College Street. By the 1920s, most Italians had moved west of Bathurst Street and the College-Clinton area had emerged as the city's major Little Italy. Italian immigration continued into the post-World War II era, where approximately 20,000 to 30,000 Italians immigrated to Canada each year between the early 1950s and the mid 1960s, many of the men working in the construction industry upon settling. In the late 1960s, the Italian economy experienced a period of growth and recovery, removing one of the primary incentives for emigration.

As early as 1961, the presence of new immigrants had already started changing Little Italy. Since the 1970s, Italian immigrants from Little Italy moved northward to Corso Italia on St. Clair Avenue West. Later in the 1970s and 80s, Italian immigrants moved to northwestern parts of the city such as Pelmo Park-Humberlea, Humber Summit and Maple Leaf. Subsequent migration followed the pattern of moving further northwest, to suburbs of Toronto, in particular, the York communities of Woodbridge in Vaughan and Nobleton in King, and the Peel community of Bolton in Caledon.

History

"Soldiers of fortune" and "men of letters" from Italy immigrated to Toronto prior to the 1850s. Toronto absorbed peddlers and craftspeople from northern Italy until the 1880s. By 1860, 17 Italians lived in Toronto. Additional tradespeople arrived by 1870. After the 1880s many came from northern Italy, with most being from Genoa. The occupations tended to be craftspeople, service tradespeople, and peddlers. Italians arrived in Toronto in large numbers during the early 20th century. Italians first settled in an area then known as The Ward, centred on University Avenue and College Street. By the 1920s, most Italians had moved west of Bathurst Street and the College-Clinton area had emerged as the city's major Little Italy. They mainly immigrated to Toronto—increasing from 4,900 Italians in 1911, to 9,000 in 1921, constituting almost two per cent of Toronto's population. Approximately 40,000 Italians came to Canada during the interwar period, predominantly from southern Italy where an economic depression and overpopulation had left many families in poverty.

Italian immigration continued into the post-World War II era, where approximately 20,000 to 30,000 Italians immigrated to Canada each year between the early 1950s and the mid 1960s. By the 1960s, more than 15,000 Italian men worked in Toronto's construction industry, representing one third of all construction workers in the city at that time. 90 per cent of the Italians who immigrated to Canada after World War II remained in Canada, and decades after that period, the community still had fluency in the Italian language. During the 1950s and 1960s, the Italian community shaped Canada's Italian culinary culture as Italian restaurants began to emerge, as well as storefront supermarkets that expanded over time, such as Longo's. In the late 1960s, the Italian economy experienced a period of growth and recovery, removing one of the primary incentives for emigration.

As early as 1961, the presence of new immigrants had already started changing Little Italy. That year, 15,000 Italians, 12,000 being immigrants, lived in Little Italy (35 per cent of the population), declining to 8,000 in 1971, and further to 3,600 in 1991 (13 per cent of the population). Since the 1970s, Italian immigrants from Little Italy moved northward to Corso Italia on St. Clair Avenue West. One of the largest celebrations on St. Clair Avenue was when Italy won the 1982 FIFA World Cup, which involved an estimated 300,000 fans, shutting the street down for nearly 20 blocks between Caledonia and Oakwood. In 1981, about 35,000 Italians lived in this area, however, by 1991, had dropped to 20,000. Much of the Italian population subsequently moved to the northwestern part of the city, and by 2001 the communities Pelmo Park-Humberlea, Humber Summit and Maple Leaf had the highest concentrations of Italian Canadians in the city, with 41.3%, 41.2% and 40.6% respectively, but have declined since then. Although the character of Toronto's two Italian enclaves (which later also included Palmerston-Little Italy and Corso Italia-Davenport) have several Italian restaurants and bakeries, the demographics of these neighbourhoods have changed drastically with a smaller Italian population than it had originally.

Subsequent migration followed the pattern of moving further northwest, to suburbs of Toronto, in particular, the York communities of Woodbridge in Vaughan and Nobleton in King, and the Peel community of Bolton in Caledon. By 2001, 79,835 Italian Canadians lived in Vaughan, accounting for 44.0 per cent of the population. As the presence of new immigrants significantly bolstered the population, the concentration of Italian Canadians has steadily declined, with 85,030 Italian Canadians accounting for 26.5 per cent of the population in 2021. In 2016, the community of Woodbridge within Vaughan was home to 55,960 of these Italian Canadians, accounting for 53.5 per cent of the population—the largest ever recorded of a Canadian community.

Demographics

Ethnicity
As of the 2021 census, 468,970 GTA residents stated they had Italian ancestry, comprising 7.1 percent of the area's population, marking a 8.3 percent decrease from the 511,680 population of the 2016 census. The majority live in Toronto, with 167,460, (six percent of the population), while 145,695 live in York (12 percent of the population) — constituting for almost 70 percent of the GTA's population.

Language and immigration
As of 2021, of the 468,970 Italians in the GTA, 89,380 are Italian born immigrants, with 128,420 claiming Italian as their mother tongue.

Media
Italian newspapers, television, and radio have existed throughout Toronto's history. Son to Italian immigrants, Johnny Lombardi was born in The Ward in 1915, and went on to found one of the first multilingual radio stations in Canada, CHIN in 1966, in Palmerston-Little Italy.

Notable residents

 Jimi Bertucci
 Alessia Cara
 Michael Cera
 Philip de Grassi (imperial officer of the United Kingdom army)
 James Forneri (professor of Modern Languages from the University of Toronto) - Originated from the Piedmont
 Johnny Lombardi
 Franceso Rossi (Toronto's first confectioner)
 Daniela Sanzone

The Italian Walk of Fame acknowledges ethnic Italians. It is located in Little Italy.

See also
 Demographics of Toronto
 Italians in Montreal

Notes

References

Further reading
 Harney, Nicholas DeMaria. Eh, Paesan!: Being Italian in Toronto (Volume 12 of Anthropological horizons). University of Toronto Press, 1998. , 9780802080998. See preview at Google Books.
 Lynde, Beverly Doris. A Study of Food Habits of Italians in Toronto. University of Toronto, 1977. See profile at Google Books.
 Harney, Nicholas DeMaria. "Ethnicity, Social Organization, and Urban Space: A Comparison of Italians in Toronto and Montreal" (Chapter 6). In: Sloan, Joanne (editor). Urban Enigmas: Montreal, Toronto, and the Problem of Comparing Cities (Volume 2 of Culture of Cities). McGill-Queen's Press (MQUP), January 1, 2007. , 9780773577077. Start p. 178.
 Stanger-Ross, Jordan. Staying Italian: Urban Change and Ethnic Life in Postwar Toronto and Philadelphia (Historical Studies of Urban America). University of Chicago Press, January 15, 2010. , 9780226770765.
 Zucchi, John E. Italians in Toronto: Development of a National Identity, 1875-1935 (Volume 3 of McGill-Queen's studies in ethnic history, ISSN 0846-8869). McGill-Queen's Press, 1990. , 9780773507821.

Ethnic groups in Toronto
European-Canadian culture in Ontario
European-Canadian culture in Toronto
 
Toronto